Márianosztra is a village in Pest county, Hungary.

Background
Márianosztra is home to the Pauline monastery of Márianosztra. The monastery was founded by Louis the Great in 1352. The town was built around the monastery and  named after the basilica  dedicated to Our Lady of Hungary, and is the name comes from the Latin term Maria Nostra (English: Our Mary)

References

Populated places in Pest County